Mykolas Alekna (born 28 September 2002) is a Lithuanian athlete who specializes in the discus throw. At the age of 19, he won the silver medal at the 2022 World Championships, becoming the youngest world discus medallist in history. Alekna was then the youngest ever winner in his discipline at the 2022 European Championships, setting the competition record in the process.

In 2021, he was the World Under-20 and European U20 champion.

Mykolas is the son of Olympic double discus throw champion Virgilijus Alekna. His brother Martynas Alekna is also a discus thrower.

Career
In June 2022, the then 19-year-old threw his career-best of 69.81 m while finishing second at the Stockholm Diamond League meet, the longest ever discus throw by a teenager. At the 2022 World Championships held in Eugene, Oregon in July, he lost only to Kristjan Čeh, becoming the youngest world discus medallist in history. Less than a month later at the European Championships Munich 2022, he became the first teenager to win a medal in the discus throw, let alone the gold, beating Čeh and all three medallists from the 2020 Tokyo Olympics. His father had won this title 16 years earlier.

International competitions

References

External links

 

Lithuanian male discus throwers
2002 births
Living people
World Athletics U20 Championships winners
21st-century Lithuanian people
European Athletics Championships winners